The men's hammer throw at the 2013 World Championships in Athletics was held at the Luzhniki Stadium on 10–12 August.

Performances in the World Championships contributed to the final scoring of the 2013 IAAF Hammer Throw Challenge – a first for the series. Paweł Fajdek was victorious in both the World Championships and the seasonal challenge

Records
Prior to the competition, the records were as follows:

Qualification standards

Schedule

Results

Qualification
Qualification: 77.00 m (Q) and at least 12 best (q) advanced to the final.

Final
The final was started at 20:30.

References

External links
Hammer throw results at IAAF website

Hammer throw
Hammer throw at the World Athletics Championships